Kilfeacle & District Rugby Football Club is an amateur rugby union club based in the village of Kilfeacle, County Tipperary. The club was founded in 1981. Today, the club's playing grounds, called Morrissey Park, or more affectionately known as "The Hill", are located in the village of Kilfeacle, approximately four miles from Tipperary Town on the N74 Tipperary to Cashel road.

The club has over 300 playing and non-playing members. The teams range in age from under 6 to under 18, which compete in East Munster competitions . The club also has 2 adult teams: First XV, Second XV. The Second team compete in a number of competitions: Gleeson League Division 2, Evans League, Webb Cup, and Gleeson Cup. The First team currently compete in the First Division of the Munster Junior League. There are also 2 more provincial cup competitions which the team annually participate; Munster Junior Cup, and Munster Junior Clubs Challenge Cup. The Mansergh Cup and Garryowen Cup are a competitions for men's rugby teams in County Tipperary, which Kilfeacle annually participate in.

References

Irish rugby union teams
Rugby union clubs in County Tipperary